"21" is the first episode of the second season of the HBO television series Boardwalk Empire, which originally aired September 25, 2011. The episode was written by series creator and executive producer Terence Winter and directed by executive producer Tim Van Patten.

Plot 
Nucky Thompson's power is challenged by the alliance of Jimmy Darmody, Eli Thompson, and the Commodore, who manipulate the Ku Klux Klan into attacking Chalky White's bootlegging warehouse. Chalky kills one of the attackers, sparking outrage in the community. Nucky orders Eli to arrest Chalky for his own protection. Jimmy reflects upon his upbringing, and Nucky's part in it. Nucky deduces that Jimmy is in league with the Commodore, and subtly warns him to carefully consider his position. Nelson Van Alden's wife Rose visits for the weekend and is dismayed by the depravity of the city. Van Alden conducts a police raid in her presence, inspiring her admiration. Meanwhile, Van Alden has a financial arrangement with Lucy to carry a child for him. While Margaret Schroeder takes her children to see The Kid, Nucky is arrested for election fraud.

Reception

Critical reception 
IGN gave the episode a score of 9 out of 10, saying that "... Season 1's finale promised a series ready to raise the bar. Judging by this episode, Season 2 looks primed to succeed at satisfying that promise." They continued by praising the "masterfully shot" speech Nucky gives to two different sides of the racial conflict.

Ratings 
The second-season premiere was watched by 2.912 million viewers, down 39% from the pilot and down 12% from its first-season finale.

References

External links 
 "21"  at HBO
 

2011 American television episodes
Boardwalk Empire episodes
Television episodes directed by Tim Van Patten
Television episodes written by Terence Winter